Federico Ubaldo Baldeschi Colonna (2 September 1625 – 4 October 1691) was an Italian Catholic Cardinal who was adopted by the noble Colonna family.

Early life

He was born on September 2, 1624, as Federico Ubaldo Baldeschi in Perugia, the son of Jacopo Baldeschi and Artemisia della Concia. The history of his education is unclear but he was called to Rome as a young man to assist Cardinal Giovanni Giacomo Panciroli. With Panciroli's patronage he was appointed Governor first of Faenza, then of Sabina and then finally of Fabriano. Soon after he was appointed referendary of the Tribunals of the Apostolic Signature of Justice and of Grace.

Ecclesiastical career
In 1665, at the age of 40, Baldeschi was elected Archbishop of Caesarea and only days later he was appointed Nuncio in Switzerland, a position he held until 1668. In 1668 he was appointed secretary of the Sacred Congregation of Propaganda Fide. In early 1673 he was appointed an assessor of the Roman Inquisition.

Cardinalate
In 1673 Baldeschi was elevated to cardinal by Pope Clement X in pectore and his elevation was published the following year, in 1674. The year after, he was appointed cardinal-priest of the church of San Marcello al Corso. Upon his elevation to the cardinalate, he was adopted by Sciarra Colonna di Carbognano and began using his adopted name; that of the Colonna family.

When Clement X died, Colonna participated in the conclave of 1676, which elected Pope Innocent XI. He was appointed Camerlengo of the Sacred College of Cardinals from 1683 until 1684. The following year he became cardinal-priest of the Basilica di Sant'Anastasia al Palatino.

He took part in the conclave of 1689 that elected Pope Alexander VIII and joined the conclave of 1691. It eventually elected Pope Innocent XII but without Colonna who was forced to leave because of illness.

Colonna never fully recovered and he died on 4 October 1691 and was buried at the church of the Propaganda Fide.

Episcopal succession

References

1625 births
1691 deaths
17th-century Italian Roman Catholic archbishops
17th-century Italian cardinals
People from Perugia
Colonna family
Apostolic Nuncios to Switzerland
Roman Catholic titular archbishops of Caesarea